The 2012 Canadian Figure Skating Championships was held from January 16 to 22, 2012 at the Moncton Coliseum in Moncton, New Brunswick. The event determined the national champions of Canada and was organized by Skate Canada, the nation's figure skating governing body. Skaters competed at the senior, junior, and novice levels in the disciplines of men's singles, women's singles, pair skating, and ice dancing. Although the official International Skating Union terminology for female skaters in the singles category is ladies, Skate Canada uses women officially. The results of this competition were among the selection criteria for the 2012 World Championships, 2012 Four Continents Championships, and the 2012 World Junior Championships.

Senior results

Men

Women

Pairs

Ice dancing

Junior results

Men

Women

Pairs

Ice dancing

Novice results

Men

Women

Pairs

Ice dancing

International team selections

World Championships
The Canadian team to the 2012 World Championships:

Of the top two ladies' skaters at nationals, the one who places highest at Four Continents Championships will receive the berth to the World Championships.

Four Continents Championships
The Canadian team to the 2012 Four Continents Championships:

World Junior Championships
The Canadian team to the 2012 World Junior Championships:

References

External links
 2012 Canadian Figure Skating Championships results archived, originally at SkateCanada.ca
 Official website at SkateCanada.ca
 Skate Canada videos

Canadian Figure Skating Championships
Figure skating
Canadian Figure Skating Championships
Sport in Moncton
2012 in New Brunswick